The 2006 Italy rugby union tour was a series of two matches played in June 2006 in Japan and Fiji by Italy national rugby union team. After a convincing victory against Japan, the team managed by Pierre Berbizier, lost against Fiji,

Results

Japan: 15.Keiji Takei, 14.Kosuke Endo, 13.Atsushi Moriya, 12.Yuta Imamura, 11.Nataniela Oto, 10.Shotaro Onishi, 9.Wataru Ikeda, 8.Hajime Kiso, 7.Ryota Asano Inose (capt.), 6.Tomoaki Nakai, 5.Tomoaki Taniguchi, 4.Takanori Kumagae, 3.Ryo Yamamura, 2.Yuji Matsubara, 1.Tomokazu Soma,  – replacements: 16.Takashi Yamaoka, 17.Yuichi Hisadomi, 18.Hitoshi Ono, 19.Takashi Kikutani, 22.Hiroki Mizuno, 22.Hiroki Mizuno, 22.Hiroki Mizuno  –  No entry : 20.Mamoru Ito, 21.Hideyuki Yoshida
Italy: 15.David Bortolussi, 14.Benjamin de Jager, 13.Andrea Masi, 12.Mirco Bergamasco, 11.Denis Dallan, 10.Ramiro Pez, 9.Paul Griffen, 8.Josh Sole, 7.Mauro Bergamasco, 6.Silvio Orlando, 5.Marco Bortolami (capt.), 4.Santiago Dellapè, 3.Carlos Nieto, 2.Fabio Ongaro, 1.Andrea Lo Cicero,  – replacements: 16.Leonardo Ghiraldini, 17.Fabio Staibano, 18.Carlo Del Fava, 19.Robert Barbieri, 20.Simon Picone, 21.Andrea Marcato, 22.Michele Sepe 

Fiji: 15.Norman Ligairi, 14.Mosese Luveitasau Yabakitini, 13.Kameli Ratuvou, 12.Seru Rabeni, 11.Rupeni Caucaunibuca, 10.Seremaia Baikeinuku, 9.Jacob Rauluni, 8.Netani Talei, 7.Alifereti Doviverata, 6.Ifereimi Rawaqa, 5.Simon Raiwalui (c), 4.Isoa Domolailai, 3.Apisai Nagi Mavua, 2.Sunia Koto Vuli, 1.Josese Baleikasavu,  – replacements: 17.Ravuama Samo, 18.Kini Salabogi, 19.Akapusi Qera, 20.Emosi Vucago, 22.Maleli Kunavore     –  No entry : 16.Joeli Lotawa, 20.Emosi Vucago, 21.Jo Tora
Italy: 15.David Bortolussi, 14.Pablo Canavosio, 13.Andrea Masi, 12.Mirco Bergamasco (capt.), 11.Michele Sepe, 10.Ramiro Pez, 9.Paul Griffen, 8.Josh Sole, 7.Mauro Bergamasco, 6.Sergio Parisse, 5.Carlo Del Fava, 4.Santiago Dellapè, 3.Carlos Nieto, 2.Fabio Ongaro, 1.Andrea Lo Cicero,  – replacements: 16.Leonardo Ghiraldini, 17.Matías Agüero, 18.Fabio Staibano, 19.Marco Bortolami, 20.Robert Barbieri     –  No entry: 21.Simon Picone, 22.Gert Peens

References
 
 

Italy
tour
Italy national rugby union team tours
tour
tour
Rugby union tours of Japan
Rugby union tours of Fiji